Violetta Napierska (sometimes Violette Napierska) was a film actress. Most of her acting career she worked in German silent films, often with Béla Lugosi (with whom she had a romantic relationship for a time), Lee Parry and director Richard Eichberg. She was born in Germany in 1890, and died in Italy in 1968 (at age 78).

The band Darling Violetta took their name from the salutation allegedly used by Béla Lugosi in his letters to Violetta Napierska.

Filmography

References

External links

Portrait of Violetta Napierska

20th-century German actresses
German silent film actresses
Place of death missing
1890 births
1968 deaths